A total of 15 members were elected to the Third House of Assembly of Vancouver Island which ruled from September 2, 1863, to August 31, 1866. This was the last parliament for an independent Colony of Vancouver Island before unification with the colony of British Columbia.

Constituencies 
Victoria City 4 members to be elected
William Alexander George Young 229 He resigned and was replaced by Charles Bedford Young October 25, 1864, who then resigned and replaced by Leonard McClure February 14, 1865.
Amor De Cosmos 211
Israel Wood Powell 203
Joseph Charles Ridge 183. He resigned and was replaced by Selim Franklin on February 1, 1864, who then resigned and was replaced by Charles Bedford Young on May 2, 1866.
Semlin Franklin 133
Pidwell 91

Victoria District 3 to be elected
Edward Henry Jackson 60. He resigned and was replaced by James Dickson on September 22, 1864.
William Fraser Tolmie 60
James Trimble 57
Mr Elliott 28

Esquimalt Town
George Foster Foster 22. He resigned and was replaced by Joseph Johnson Southgate on September 22, 1864, who then resigned and was replaced by Edward Stamp on May 18, 1866.
Mr Cocker 14

Esquimalt and Metchosin 2 to be elected
John Sebastian Helmcken elected by acclamation
Robert Burnaby elected by acclamation who resigned and was replaced by John Ash on November 28, 1865.

Lake District
James Duncan elected by acclamation.

Saanich District
Charles Street elected by acclamation. He resigned and was replaced by John James Cochrane on November 2, 1864.

Saltspring Island and Chemainus
John Trevasso Pidwell He resigned and was replaced by George Edgar Dennes on October 13, 1863, who then resigned and was replaced by John Trevasso Pidwell on May 30, 1866.
G.E.Dennes (he seems to have received more votes than Pidwell but seems to have been disqualified)

Nanaimo (vote totals were not reported in the paper)
Charles Alfred Bayley He resigned and was replaced by Thomas Cunningham on January 5, 1866.
David Babington Ring

Sooke
James Carswell elected by acclamation

References 

1863
History of Vancouver Island
Colony of Vancouver Island
1863 elections in North America
1863 in British Columbia